Sandhiya Ranganathan (born 20 May 1998) is an Indian professional footballer who plays as a forward for the India women's national football team and Gokulam Kerala in the Indian Women's League.

International career 
She scored her first goal in 2018 in the COTIF Women's Football Tournament. Then she scored her second goal against Sri Lanka in the 2019 SAFF Women's Championship on 17 March 2019. In 2020 AFC Women's Olympic Qualifying Round 2 she scored another important goal for the national team against Nepal on 6 April 2019.

International goals
Scores and results list India's goal tally first.

Honours

India
 SAFF Women's Championship: 2019
 South Asian Games Gold medal: 2019

Sethu
Indian Women's League: 2018–19

Tamil Nadu
 National Games Bronze medal: 2022

Individual
 Indian Women's League Most Valuable Player: 2018–19

See also
 List of Indian Women's League hat-tricks

References

External links 
 Sandhiya Ranganathan at All India Football Federation
 

Living people
People from Cuddalore district
Footballers from Tamil Nadu
Sportswomen from Tamil Nadu
Sethu FC players
Indian women's footballers
India women's international footballers
Women's association football forwards
1998 births
Gokulam Kerala FC Women players
Indian Women's League players
South Asian Games gold medalists for India
South Asian Games medalists in football